Izak is a given name.

Izak may also refer to:
 Izak catshark, a type of cat shark
 Izak, a character in Suikoden IV
 Piotr "Izak" Skowyrski, Polish esports commentator and streamer
 Vian Izak, American singer/songwriter, producer, and audio engineer

See also
 Izakaya, a Japanese drinking establishment
 Izakaya Chōji, a Japanese film
 Izaskun Aramburu, a Spanish canoer
 Isak (surname)
 Itzig family, German-Jewish family
 Itzig, Luxembourg, a town
 Itz, river in Germany
 Izaak Walton League, environmental organization
 Izaak-Walton-Killam Award, awarded to Canadian researchers
 Izaak Synagogue, in Kraków, Poland
 Isakhel, a town in Pakistan
 Isakhel Tehsil, area in Pakistan
 Izsák (Hungary), a town in Hungary
 Izsak (crater) on the Moon